Figtree is a town on the island of Nevis in Saint Kitts and Nevis. It is the capital of Saint John Figtree Parish.

References 

Populated places in Saint Kitts and Nevis